The Indian 25 coin,  popularly called Chawanni is a former denomination of the Indian rupee. The 25 paisa coin is worth  of a rupee (1 rupee = 100 paise).

Introduction and Demonetization
The 25 Paisa coin was introduced in 1957. Prior to this, the 25 paise coin was known as the " rupee", which was equivalent to 4 annas (1 rupee = 16 annas). On June 30, 2011, the 25 paisa and all lower denomination coins were officially demonetized.

Features
 Ferritic Stainless Steel was used to mint the 25 paisa coin.
 The diameter of the coin is 19 mm. 
 Weight of the coin is 2.83 g.
 In 1964-1983 the 25 paisa coin was minted in Copper-Nickel.

References

Historical currencies of India
Coins of India